Route 206 is a short provincial highway located in the Estrie region in Quebec. The highway stretches from Route 147 in Coaticook as an east/northeast continuation of Route 141 (which continues southeast towards Dixville) to Route 253 in eastern Saint-Malo via Sainte-Edwidge-De-Clifton. In the latter municipality it briefly overlaps Route 251, which runs to Saint-Herménégilde and Martinville.

Municipalities along Route 206
 Coaticook
 Compton
 Sainte-Edwidge-De-Clifton
 Saint-Malo

Major intersections

See also
 List of Quebec provincial highways

References

External links
 Official Quebec Road Map of Transports Quebec 
 Route 206 on Google Maps

206